Mirani is a town in the Balochistan province of Pakistan. It is located at 28°32'20N 66°19'20E with an altitude of 1877 metres (6161 feet).

References

Populated places in Balochistan, Pakistan